Scott Foresman was an elementary educational publisher for PreK through Grade 6 in all subject areas. Its titles are now owned by Savvas Learning Company which formed from former Pearson Education K12 division. The old Glenview headquarters of Scott Foresman is empty as of August 2020, and Crain's Chicago Business reported that the broker hired to sell the property had missed a mortgage payment.

Company history
Scott Foresman and Company was founded in 1896 by Erastus Howard Scott, Editor and President; Hugh A. Foresman, Salesman and Secretary; and his brother, William Coates Foresman, Treasurer. However, the company's origins extend back several years earlier.

Early years
E. H. Scott started in business in 1889, when he and C. J. Albert of the Albert Teachers Agency formed a partnership, "Albert and Scott". The company’s first publication was Bellum Helveticum (1889), a high school Latin textbook.

In 1894, Hugh Foresman purchased Albert's interest in the publishing company and joined E. H. Scott. The following year, the Albert and Scott corporation purchased the publishing business, rights, and stock of George Sherwood and Company, which also published textbooks. Also in 1895, the firm moved its business to larger quarters at 307 S. Wabash Avenue in Chicago. On February 13, 1896, W. Coates Foresman joined the business and the corporation's name was changed to Scott, Foresman and Company. That same year, the young company purchased S. C. Griggs and Company, whose catalogue included a long list of miscellaneous books, including Robert’s Rules of Order.

When the company had been in business for only one year, it secured its first large state adoption. In 1897, the state of Kansas awarded Scott, Foresman and Company a five-year contract for eight publications. The following year, the firm moved to 623 South Wabash Avenue. In 1898, Hugh Foresman was elected Vice President. At this time, the company decided to publish books in the elementary field. In 1908 it recruited R. C. McNamara as office manager from Princeton University who ran a cooperative store at Princeton which became the University Store. The business plan of the U-Store today is essentially the same one that he devised in 1905 at age 24.

Publisher of early readers series
In the late 1920s and early 1930s, William Scott Gray (1885–1960), director of the Curriculum Foundation Series at Scott Foresman, co-authored with William H. Elson the Elson Basic Readers (renamed the Elson-Gray Basic Readers in 1936), which Scott Foresman published in Chicago. Zerna Sharp, a reading consultant and textbook editor for Scott Foresman, worked with Gray to develop what became the publisher's series of Dick and Jane readers. Sharp named and developed the characters of "Dick" and "Jane" who made their debut in the Elson-Gray Readers in 1930 and continued in a subsequent series of beginning readers after the Elson-Gray series ended in 1940. Gray wrote and Eleanor B. Campbell did most of the illustrations for the early Dick and Jane readers, while Sharp selected and edited the storylines, and supervised production of the series. 

The Dick and Jane series of primers monopolized the market for nearly four decades and reached the height of their popularity in the 1950s, when 80 percent of first-grade students in the United States were learning to read though the Dick and Jane stories. In the 1965 edition, the last of the Dick and Jane series, Scott Foresman introduced the first African American family as characters in a first-grade reader. In the 1970s and 1980s, the series was replaced with other reading texts.

Relocation of its headquarters
In 1966, Scott, Foresman moved from Chicago to a facility designed by Jeffery Finkle at a new location in Glenview, Illinois; a new distribution center was opened in Pinola, Indiana. After the spinoff of Pearson K12 to Savvas Learning Company, the Glenview location was put up for sale in 2020.

Acquisions and mergers
Scott, Foresman became a public corporation and was listed on the New York Stock Exchange. William Morrow and Company and South-Western Publishing were acquired by Scott, Foresman in 1967. Morrow was sold to the Hearst Corporation in 1981. 

The company was taken private in a leveraged buyout in 1985. In 1986, Time Inc. bought Scott, Foresman and International Thomson bought South-Western. Around that time the comma was dropped from the company's name. Three years later, Time sold Scott Foresman to HarperCollins, the book publishing subsidiary of News Corporation. In 1996, News Corp sold the brand to Pearson PLC, the global publisher and owner of Penguin and the Financial Times. Then Scott Foresman, along with more than 100 other educational brands, merged to become Pearson, with Scott Foresman adopting the new name, Pearson Scott Foresman. In February 2019, Pearson spun off its US-based K-12 courseware business, which was renamed Pearson K12 Learning. The newly independent K-12 publishing company later rebranded as Savvas Learning Company in May 2020.

Legacy of publications
Scott Foresman were well known for their publications of the popular Thorndike Barnhart range of school dictionaries, namely the Scott Foresman Advanced Dictionary, Scott Foresman Intermediate Dictionary, and Scott Foresman Beginning Dictionary also published as the Thorndike Barnhart Student Dictionary, the Thorndike Barnhart Advanced Junior Dictionary, and the Thorndike Barnhart Junior Dictionary. These dictionaries were abandoned in the first year of Scott Foresman's acquisition by Pearson Education in 1998.

References

External links

 Savvas website

Educational publishing companies of the United States
Book publishing companies based in Illinois
Educational book publishing companies
Publishing companies established in 1896
American companies established in 1896
Companies based in Glenview, Illinois
Former News Corporation subsidiaries